Dasystoma is a genus of moths in the Lypusidae family.

Species
 Dasystoma salicella (Hübner, 1796)
 Dasystoma kurentzovi (Lvovsky, 1990)

References

Lypusidae